Fear Files is an Indian horror anthology television series which aired from 30 June 2012 to 10 February 2019 on Zee TV. 

Sypnosis

Fear Files uncovers the truth behind some of the most compelling, mystifying and seemingly unexplainable images that have occurred in different places in India. It is a show focused on the realm of the supernatural, paranormal and mysterious events that sometimes take place in our lives. This gripping, filmic and high-octane drama-documentary series brings to life the real stories of people who have lived through paranormal experiences that defy explanation. The show introduces paranormal experts who are incredibly gifted in their fields of expertise, and see what no one else can. Their methods and findings are revealed as a compelling conclusion of each episode - which gel into one undeniable and often terrifying conclusion.

Series overview

External links

 Fear Files: Darr Ki Sacchi Tasvirein Streaming on ZEE5

Zee TV original programming
2012 Indian television series debuts
Paranormal reality television series
Indian horror fiction television series